Brixton Road railway station served the village of Brixton, Devon, England from 1898 to 1960 on the Plymouth to Yealmpton Branch.

History 
The station opened on 17 January 1898 by the Great Western Railway. A signal box and goods shed, along with its sidings, were installed in May 1905. Due to it being outdone by road competition, the station closed on 7 July 1930 but remained open to goods traffic. It reopened on 3 November 1941 but the passenger services were diverted to  instead of  because the goods yard had been damaged by bombs in the Second World War so it had been temporarily closed. The station closed to passengers again on 6 October 1947 and to goods traffic on 29 February 1960.

References

External links 

Disused railway stations in Devon
Former Great Western Railway stations
Railway stations in Great Britain opened in 1898
Railway stations in Great Britain closed in 1930
Railway stations in Great Britain opened in 1941
Railway stations in Great Britain closed in 1947
1898 establishments in England
1960 disestablishments in England